Asharf ol Eslam (also Romanized as Āshraf ol Eslām; also known as Sharf ol Salām) is a village in Jargalan Rural District, Raz and Jargalan District, Bojnord County, North Khorasan Province, Iran. At the 2006 census, its population was 369, in 87 families.

References 

Populated places in Bojnord County